Seth Emil Olofsson (17 January 1915 – 10 October 1970) was a Swedish skier. He competed in the military patrol at the 1936 Summer Olympics.

References

1915 births
1970 deaths
People from Boden Municipality
Swedish military patrol (sport) runners
Winter Olympics competitors for Sweden
Military patrol competitors at the 1936 Winter Olympics